Nick Pace (born April 17, 1987) is a former American professional mixed martial artist who competed in the bantamweight division. A professional MMA competitor since 2008, Pace mostly fought in the Ring of Combat promotion where he was the reigning and inaugural Ring of Combat Bantamweight champion until he signed with World Extreme Cagefighting. After the WECs merger with the UFC, Pace became a member of the UFC. After he retired from MMA in 2017, he became a professional Jiu jitsu competitor and competed in the Combat Jiu-Jitsu Worlds tournament hosted by Eddie Bravo

Mixed martial arts career

Background
Pace trains with the Tiger Schulmann Fight Team in Elmwood Park, New Jersey, alongside former Bellator champion Lyman Good and former UFC Bantamweight title contender Jimmie Riveral. Pace is head instructor at the Staten Island branch of Tiger Schulmann's Mixed Martial Arts and has trained with the team since the age of 10, influenced by his childhood love of The Teenage Mutant Ninja Turtles.

Bellator
Pace began his career in the Ring of Combat promotion at Ring of Combat 22. He defeated Sean Santella via unanimous decision. Pace then joined the Bellator Fighting Championships and gained notice in the media with a flying knee KO of Collin Tebo. Pace later said "I hope Bellator calls me because I know I can win their tournament, but I hope the WEC calls me too."

Ring of Combat
Despite his wishes to compete in the Bellator tournament, he did not return and instead rejoined Ring of Combat where he defeated Lennox Chance via submission (rear naked choke) in the first round. He followed this up with a unanimous decision victory over Jose Adriano at Ring of Combat 29.

Pace was then rewarded with a Ring of Combat Bantamweight Championship fight against Steve DeAngelis. Pace was able to neutralise the wrestling of his opponent to keep himself out of trouble. Pace then secured a D'Arce Choke for the tapout, to take the title and become the inaugural champion. Pace would later have to relinquish the title, however, after signing with World Extreme Cagefighting.

World Extreme Cagefighting
Pace made his WEC debut against Demetrious Johnson on September 30, 2010, replacing Clint Godfrey.  He lost the fight via unanimous decision.

Ultimate Fighting Championship
In October 2010, World Extreme Cagefighting merged with the Ultimate Fighting Championship. As part of the merger, all WEC fighters were transferred to the UFC.

Pace faced Will Campuzano on December 4, 2010 at The Ultimate Fighter: Team GSP vs. Team Koscheck Finale. Pace failed to make weight for the bout, so it was fought as a catchweight bout. Pace defeated Campuzano in the 3rd round with a pillory choke, which was the first time the submission was used in a professional mixed martial arts bout.

Pace was expected to face Michael McDonald on August 6, 2011 at UFC 133.  However, Pace instead faced Ivan Menjivar at the event after McDonald was pulled from the bout to compete at UFC 130. Pace lost via unanimous decision (29-28, 29-28, 29-28).

Pace faced Miguel Torres on November 19, 2011 at UFC 139 in a catchweight bout of 141 pounds after missing weight. Pace lost a decisive decision to Torres after three rounds.

After losing to Torres, and missing weight for the second time in three fights, Pace was released from the promotion.

Cage Fury Fighting Championships
After four years away from competition, Pace made his return to MMA and fought for the CFFC Bantamweight Championship against Ricky Bandejas on Oct 31, 2015. He won the bout and became the title holder. He then defended his title two years later against Ahmet Kayretli. He retired from MMA shortly after and vacated the title.

Comeback to competition 
A year later, Pace made his comeback to martial arts competition in the Combat Jiu Jitsu Worlds BJJ tournament.  He has competed in this tournament twice to date.

Championships and accomplishments
Ring of Combat
ROC Bantamweight Championship (One time)
Cage Fury Fighting Championships
CFFC Bantamweight Championship (One time, Current)
Opened his own Tiger Schulmanns School in Tottenvile, Staten Island NY where he teaches alongside his brother Ricky Pace

Mixed martial arts record

|-
|Win
|align=center| 8–3
|Ahmet Kayretli
|Submission (rear naked choke)
|Cage Fury Fighting Championships 63
|
|align=center| 3
|align=center| 3:47
|Atlantic City, New Jersey, United States
|
|-
|Win
|align=center| 7–3
|Ricky Bandejas
|Submission (rear naked choke)
|Cage Fury Fighting Championships 52
|
|align=center| 1
|align=center| 2:51
|Atlantic City, New Jersey, United States
|
|-
|Loss
|align=center| 6–3
|Miguel Torres
|Decision (unanimous)
|UFC 139
|
|align=center| 3
|align=center| 5:00
|San Jose, California, United States
|
|-
|Loss
|align=center| 6–2
|Ivan Menjivar
|Decision (unanimous)
|UFC 133
|
|align=center| 3
|align=center| 5:00
|Philadelphia, Pennsylvania, United States
|
|-
|Win
|align=center| 6–1
|Will Campuzano
|Submission (Pace choke)
|The Ultimate Fighter 12 Finale
|
|align=center| 3
|align=center| 4:32
|Las Vegas, Nevada, United States
|
|-
|Loss
|align=center| 5–1
|Demetrious Johnson
|Decision (unanimous)
|WEC 51
|
|align=center| 3
|align=center| 5:00
|Broomfield, Colorado, United States
|
|-
|Win
|align=center| 5–0
|Steve DeAngelis
|Submission (D'arce choke)
|Ring of Combat 30
|
|align=center| 1
|align=center| 3:03
|Atlantic City, New Jersey, United States
|
|-
|Win
|align=center| 4–0
|Jose Adriano
|Decision (unanimous)
|Ring of Combat 29
|
|align=center| 3
|align=center| 4:00
|Atlantic City, New Jersey, United States
|
|-
|Win
|align=center| 3–0
|Lennox Chance
|Submission (rear naked choke)
|Ring of Combat 28 
|
|align=center| 1
|align=center| 1:37
|Atlantic City, New Jersey, United States
|
|-
|Win
|align=center| 2–0
|Collin Tebo
|KO (flying knee)
|Bellator 11
|
|align=center| 1
|align=center| 1:37
|Uncasville, Connecticut, United States
|
|-
|Win
|align=center| 1–0
|Sean Santella
|Decision (unanimous)
|Ring of Combat 22
|
|align=center| 2
|align=center| 4:00
|Atlantic City, New Jersey, United States
|

References

External links

Official UFC Profile

American male mixed martial artists
Bantamweight mixed martial artists
Living people
Sportspeople from New York City
1987 births
Ultimate Fighting Championship male fighters